Mai Dunama was the head of the Sayfawa confederacy during the early part of the twelfth century. He was supposedly the first Mai to take a pilgrimage to Mecca.

References
 Gerald S. Graham, Thomas Hodgkin; Nigerian Perspectives: An Historical Anthology

Rulers of the Kanem Empire
12th-century monarchs in Africa
Year of death unknown
Year of birth unknown